The Aero A.19 was a biplane fighter aircraft designed in Czechoslovakia in 1923 and considered by the Czech Air Force against its stablemates the A.18 and A.20. The A.18 was selected for production and development of the A.19 was abandoned.

Specifications (A.19)

See also

A019
Single-engined tractor aircraft
Biplanes
1920s Czechoslovakian fighter aircraft